is a station on the Tōkyū Ikegami Line in southeast Tokyo, Japan. It is also within walking distance from Osaki Station.

Station layout
An elevated island platform.

History 
October 9, 1927 Opened (Togoshi-Ginza - Ōsaki-Hirokōji opened).
June 17, 1928 Ōsaki-Hirokōji - Gotanda opened.
Osaki Hirokoji Station features in Ozu Yasujiro's 1957 film Tokyo Twilight (Tokyo Boshoku).

Bus services 
 bus stop
Tokyu Bus
<渋41>Shibuya Sta. - Naka-Meguro Sta. - Ōtori Shrine mae - Ōsaki-Hirokōji - Ōsaki Sta. - Ōimachi Sta.
<渋72>Shibuya Sta. (East Exit) - Ebisu Sta. - Ōtori Shrine mae - Meguro Fudo - Ōsaki-Hirokōji - Gotanda Sta.
<反01>Gotanda Sta. - Ōsaki-Hirokōji - Ebara Garage - Ikegami Police Station - Tamagawa Ōhashi - Kawasaki Sta.
<反02>Gotanda Sta. - Ōsaki-Hirokōji - Ebara Garage - Ikegami Police Station
<反11>Gotanda Sta. - Ōsaki-Hirokōji - Gakugeidaigaku Sta. - Setagaya Ward Citizen Hall

External links   
  Oosakihirokouji Station (Tokyu)

Tokyu Ikegami Line
Stations of Tokyu Corporation
Railway stations in Japan opened in 1927
Railway stations in Tokyo